At the 2004 Summer Olympics, in Athens, eight diving events  were contested during a competition that took place at the Olympic Aquatic Centre, from 20 to 28 August (14 and 16 August for the synchronized events), comprising a total of 129 divers from 30 nations.

Medal summary

Men

Women

Medal table

Participating nations
Here are listed the nations that were represented in the diving events and, in brackets, the number of national competitors.

See also
 Diving at the 2003 Pan American Games

References

External links
Official result book – Diving

 
2004 Summer Olympics events
2004
2004 in diving
Diving competitions in Greece